AGERPRES is the national news agency of Romania.

History 
The National News Agency "AGERPRES" is the oldest Romanian news agency and the first autonomous agency in Romania. It was established in March 1889 at the initiative of Foreign Minister Petre P. Carp, as the Telegraph Agency of Romania or Romanian Agency with serving as a "fast and accurate service of all general or special interest news".

The Telegraph Agency of Romania was suspended from the end of 1916 until the end of World War I. On June 16, 1921, it established the agency Orient-Radio, "caring only for the general interest and that of its subscribers."

In 1926 it takes place a new reorganization of the agency, the Romanian Parliament decided shifting to name RADOR - Information Telegraph Agency. Later, in 1949, the first news agency in Romania becomes AGERPRES.

In 1990, is established ROMPRES and six years later ROMPRES becomes a member of the European Alliance of News Agencies (EANA).

The first website of the National Press Agency it is launched in 1999.

The National News Agency returns to the AGERPRES name in July 2008, following the amendment of Law no. 19/2003 on the organization and functioning of the National Press ROMPRES.

AGERPRES has the largest archive of photographs from Romania, as well as an internal and external photo service which provides in real-time, over 1,000 photos.

On September 17, 2013, AGERPRES went through a rebranding process that consisted of focusing on the online environment, enriching the multimedia area with an interactive video platform and introducing the concept of a complete journalist.

See also
 List of news agencies

References
Agerpres History

External links
 www.agerpres.ro (official website)

Mass media in Romania
News agencies based in Romania
1889 establishments in Romania